Aliçopehlivan (formerly Koyunyeri) is a village in the İpsala district of Edirne Province, Turkey.

It is situated in the plains of Rumeli (East Thrace). The population of Aliçopehlivan was 1,921. During the  Russo-Turkish War (1877-1878), the Muslim population (Turks and Pomaks) of the villages Lukovit and Koynare (both in modern Bulgaria) escaped from the Russian armies and were settled in the newly founded Koyunyeri (literally "place of sheep"), which refers to the ranges for sheep around the village and also bears semblance to the refugees' old village's name, Koynare.

A wrestler named Aliço, who won the Kırkpınar oil wrestling tournament for 27 consecutive years, was a resident of Koyunyeri, and in 1998, the village was renamed after Aliço (Aliçopehliven literally means "wrestler Aliço").

Today, most of village residents either work in the dairy farms or in rice fields.

References

Villages in İpsala District
Pomak communities in Turkey